National Comprehensive Cancer Network (NCCN) is an alliance of 32 cancer centers in the United States, most of which are designated by the National Cancer Institute (one of the U.S. National Institutes of Health) as comprehensive cancer centers. It is a non-profit organization with offices in Plymouth Meeting, Pennsylvania. John W. Sweetenham, MD, FRCP, FACP, FASCO, from UT Southwestern Simmons Comprehensive Cancer Center, is chairman of the NCCN Board of Directors. It publishes the peer-reviewed medical journal Journal of the National Comprehensive Cancer Network.

NCCN Member Institutions 
Experts from the 32 NCCN Member Institutions are recognized for dealing with complex, aggressive, or rare cancers.

The 32 NCCN Member Institutions are:
 Abramson Cancer Center at the University of Pennsylvania
 Alvin J. Siteman Cancer Center at Barnes-Jewish Hospital and Washington University School of Medicine
 Case Comprehensive Cancer Center/University Hospitals Seidman Cancer Center and Cleveland Clinic Taussig Cancer Institute
 City of Hope National Medical Center
 Dana-Farber/Brigham and Women's Cancer Center | Massachusetts General Hospital Cancer Center
 Duke Cancer Institute
 Fox Chase Cancer Center
 Fred & Pamela Buffett Cancer Center at the University of Nebraska Medical Center
 Fred Hutchinson Cancer Center
 Huntsman Cancer Institute at the University of Utah
 Indiana University Melvin and Bren Simon Comprehensive Cancer Center
 Mayo Clinic Cancer Center
 Memorial Sloan Kettering Cancer Center
 Moffitt Cancer Center
 O'Neal Comprehensive Cancer Center at University of Alabama at Birmingham
 Robert H. Lurie Comprehensive Cancer Center
 Roswell Park Comprehensive Cancer Center
 St. Jude Children's Research Hospital/The University of Tennessee Health Science Center
 Stanford Cancer Institute
 The Ohio State University Comprehensive Cancer Center - James Cancer Hospital and Solove Research Institute
 The Sidney Kimmel Comprehensive Cancer Center at Johns Hopkins
 University of Texas MD Anderson Cancer Center
 UC Davis Comprehensive Cancer Center
 UC San Diego Moores Cancer Center
 UCLA Jonsson Comprehensive Cancer Center
 UCSF Helen Diller Family Comprehensive Cancer Center
 University of Colorado Cancer Center
 University of Michigan Rogel Cancer Center
 University of Wisconsin Carbone Cancer Center
 University of Texas Southwestern Medical Center
 Vanderbilt-Ingram Cancer Center
 Yale Cancer Center/Smilow Cancer Hospital

See also

 American Cancer Society Cancer Action Network
 American Cancer Society Center
 Canadian Cancer Society
 National Cancer Institute
 Oncology
 Programme of Action for Cancer Therapy

References

"New developments from National Comprehensive Cancer Network (NCCN) outlined recently" Physician Law Weekly August 1, 2007
"New Guidelines Updates from National Comprehensive Cancer Network" Cancerwatch Online (March 2004) 13(3)

"NCCN and ACS Team Up to Provide Easy to Understand Information on Cancer Treatment Options"

External links 
National Comprehensive Cancer Network - Physician Website
National Comprehensive Cancer Network - Patient Website

Cancer organizations based in the United States
Medical and health organizations based in Pennsylvania